After a 17-year absence, the Saskatchewan Roughriders returned to the Grey Cup final. Their losing streak in the big game continued, however, as it was the other Rough Riders that took home the prize.

Canadian football news in 1951
The BC Lions were formed in January at the Arctic Club in Vancouver; however, the franchise would begin play at the start of the 1954 season.

E. Kent Philips of Saskatoon, Saskatchewan, was appointed WIFU Commissioner. The IRFU allowed the third-place Toronto Argonauts to be in the playoffs due to similar regular season records with the other top two teams.

On October 27, The Duke of Edinburgh and The Princess Elizabeth, Duchess of Edinburgh (later Queen Elizabeth II) attended the western semi-final in Edmonton.

Regular season

Final regular season standings
Note: GP = Games Played, W = Wins, L = Losses, T = Ties, PF = Points For, PA = Points Against, Pts = Points

Bold text means that they have clinched the playoffs.
Saskatchewan and Ottawa both have first round byes.
McMaster University started ORFU play in October. It played 4 point games

Grey Cup playoffs
Note: All dates in 1951

Semifinals

 The Edmonton Eskimos went on to play the Saskatchewan Roughriders in the WIFU Finals.

 Hamilton won the total-point series by 31–28. The Tiger-Cats went on to play the Ottawa Rough Riders in the IRFU Finals.

Finals

 Saskatchewan won the best of three series 2–1. The Roughriders advanced to the Grey Cup game.

 Sarnia won the total-point series by 56–53. The Imperials went on to play the Ottawa Rough Riders in the Eastern finals.

 Ottawa won the best of three series 2–0. The Rough Riders went on to play the Sarnia Imperials in the Eastern finals.

Eastern Finals

 The Ottawa Rough Riders advanced to the Grey Cup game.

Playoff bracket

Grey Cup Championship

1951 Interprovincial Rugby Football Union All-Stars
NOTE: During this time most players played both ways, so the All-Star selections do not distinguish between some offensive and defensive positions.
QB – Bernie Custis, Hamilton Tiger-Cats
HB – Ulysses Curtis, Toronto Argonauts
HB – Billy Bass, Toronto Argonauts
HB – Hal Waggoner, Hamilton Tiger-Cats
E  – Vince Mazza, Hamilton Tiger-Cats
E  – Bob Simpson, Ottawa Rough Riders
FW – Bruce Cummings, Ottawa Rough Riders
C  – Ed Hirsch, Toronto Argonauts
G  – Ray Cicia, Montreal Alouettes
G  – Eddie Bevan, Hamilton Tiger-Cats
T  – Jack Carpenter, Hamilton Tiger-Cats
T  – Bob Gain, Ottawa Rough Riders

1951 Western Interprovincial Football Union All-Stars
NOTE: During this time most players played both ways, so the All-Star selections do not distinguish between some offensive and defensive positions.
1st Team
QB – Glenn Dobbs, Saskatchewan Roughriders
HB – Tom Casey, Winnipeg Blue Bombers
HB – Normie Kwong, Edmonton Eskimos
FB – Mike King, Edmonton Eskimos
E  – Jack Russell, Winnipeg Blue Bombers
E  – Neil Armstrong, Winnipeg Blue Bombers
FW – Bob Paffrath, Edmonton Eskimos
C  – Red Ettinger, Saskatchewan Roughriders
G  – Mario DeMarco, Edmonton Eskimos
G  – Bert Iannone, Saskatchewan Roughriders
T  – Martin Ruby, Saskatchewan Roughriders
T  – Buddy Tinsley, Winnipeg Blue Bombers2nd Team
QB – Jack Jacobs, Winnipeg Blue Bombers
HB – Ken Charlton, Saskatchewan Roughriders
HB – Rollie Miles, Edmonton Eskimos
FB – Jim Spavital, Winnipeg Blue Bombers
FW – Bud Korchak, Winnipeg Blue Bombers
E  – Jack Nix, Saskatchewan Roughriders
E  – Rollin Prather, Edmonton Eskimos
C  – Eagle Keys, Edmonton Eskimos
C  – Bill Blackburn, Saskatchewan Roughriders
G  – Gary Deleeuw, Winnipeg Blue Bombers
G  – Jim Quondamatteo, Edmonton Eskimos
T  – Chuck Quilter, Edmonton Eskimos
T  – Dick Huffman, Winnipeg Blue Bombers

1951 Ontario Rugby Football Union All-Stars
NOTE: During this time most players played both ways, so the All-Star selections do not distinguish between some offensive and defensive positions.
QB – George Curtis, Sarnia Imperials
HB – Johnny Chorostecki, Sarnia Imperials
HB – Mel Hawkrigg, McMaster University
HB – Ralph Pulley, Toronto Balmy Beach Beachers
HB – Al Farris, Sarnia Imperials
HB – John Duchene, Sarnia Imperials
E  – Andy Gilmour, Toronto Balmy Beach Beachers
E  – Keith Fisher, Sarnia Imperials
FW – John Florence, Sarnia Imperials
C  – Bruce Mattingly, Sarnia Imperials
G  – Jim Thomas, Toronto Balmy Beach Beachers
G  – Matti Ferrention, Toronto Balmy Beach Beachers
T  – Walt Bashak, McMaster University
T  – Lloyd "Dutch" Davey, Sarnia Imperials

1951 Canadian Football Awards
 Jeff Russel Memorial Trophy (IRFU MVP) – Bruce Cummings (FW), Ottawa Rough Riders
 Jeff Nicklin Memorial Trophy (WIFU MVP) - Glenn Dobbs (QB), Saskatchewan Roughriders
 Gruen Trophy (IRFU Rookie of the Year) - Bruno Bitkowski (C/DE) Ottawa Rough Riders
 Dr. Beattie Martin Trophy (WIFU Rookie of the Year) - Jim Chambers (HB), Edmonton Eskimos
 Imperial Oil Trophy (ORFU MVP) - Bruce Mattingly (C), Sarnia Imperials

References 

 
Canadian Football League seasons
Grey Cups hosted in Toronto